Hamilton Parke O'Connor,  (November 10, 1844 – September 13, 1900) was an Ontario lawyer and political figure. He represented Bruce South in the Legislative Assembly of Ontario from 1882 to 1894 as a Liberal member.

He was born in London, Canada West in 1844, the son of Hamilton Bligh O'Connor. He qualified to practice as an attorney in 1867 and was called to the bar in 1878. In 1875, he married Jane Watkins McLean. O'Connor served as mayor of Walkerton in 1880 and 1881. He was elected to the provincial assembly in an 1882 by-election held after Rupert Mearse Wells was elected to the House of Commons. In 1890, he was named Queen's Counsel. He died in 1900.

References

External links 
 The Canadian parliamentary companion, 1891 JA Gemmill

1844 births
1900 deaths
Canadian King's Counsel
Mayors of places in Ontario
Ontario Liberal Party MPPs
Politicians from London, Ontario